Dr. B. R. Ambedkar School of Economics University, Bengaluru, formerly Bengaluru Dr. B. R. Ambedkar School of Economics (BASE) University and still informally known as BASE University is a unitary university located in Bengaluru, Karnataka, India. Initially established as an autonomous institution in 2017, it was granted the university status in 2018 by the state government in order to get funds and recognition from the University Grants Commission (UGC). The flagship program at University is the 5-year Integrated M.Sc. in Economics. It also has a 2-year MSc programme in Economics and a PhD programme in the same field.

History 
The Government of Karnataka constituted a committee of experts under the chairmanship of Shri. S. V. Ranganath, Vice Chairman, KSHEC & former Chief Secretary to the Government of Karnataka. Based on the recommendation of this committee, the Government of Karnataka & Honorable Chief Minister Shri Siddaramaiah approved the establishment of this institution at a total cost of Rs 350 crores, Rs 275 crores from government funding and Rs 75 crores from corporate sources & released Rs 107 crores in the financial year 2016–17. The Government of Karnataka has allotted 43.45 acres of land In the Jnana Bharathi Campus of Bangalore University for the establishment of the institute.

Hon. President Pranab Mukherjee on 14 April 2017 laid the foundation stone for the Dr B.R. Ambedkar School of Economics in the Bengaluru University campus on the 126th birth anniversary of the architect of the Indian Constitution.

The first batch of B.Sc. (Honours) Economics was admitted in June–July 2017. The foundation stone was laid by then president late Shri Pranab Mukherjee. The Academic session was inaugurated at Dr. B. R. Ambedkar Bhavan by former Prime Minister of India Dr. Manmohan Singh, world-renowned Economist on 4 October 2017. Keynote speaker of this occasion was Dr. C Rangarajan, former Governor of Reserve Bank of India and the then Chairperson of the Prime Minister's Economic Advisory Council.

Campus 
The institute is situated on a 43.45 acre land allotted by the Government of Karnataka. Situated in Bengaluru, the capital of Karnataka, the institute has numerous amenities and transportation facilities in its vicinity. Apart from having air-conditioned smart classrooms, the campus also houses an auditorium, a learning resource centre, student gym facilities, and residence for the staff as well as the students.

Academics

Programs Offered

5 Year Integrated MSc Economics 
The flagship program of University, rigorously training students for a duration of 5 years in the field of economics. The syllabus is well designed to build an in depth understanding of economics along with allied areas. There is an emphasis on developing quantitative skills via econometrics and statistics. The students have an option to exit after 3 years with a degree of BSc (H) Economics.

MSc Economics 
University offers a 2-year MSc Economics as well as in Financial Economics program for candidates who are well motivated and seek an in depth understanding in various subjects in the domain of Economics. The quantitative focus in the core courses will add value in any area of employment. In addition, the elective courses will permit a specialisation designed for the corporate sector, public policy or research or any combination of these that each student is interested in.

PhD Economics 
University offers a full-time Ph.D. program for candidates who are motivated, have a distinguished academic record and intellectual curiosity. The main goal of the Doctoral program is to facilitate and nurture students to carry out academic research on complex issues in Economics and Developmental Studies. The University has a quantitative orientation and encourages interdisciplinary studies. This program is designed to create academic, corporate and policy researchers equipped in researching in areas of national and global economic issues.

Organisation and administration

Governing Council 

The present composition of the governing council of Bengaluru Dr. B.R. Ambedkar School of Economics is as follows:

See also
Madras School of Economics
Delhi School of Economics
Jamia Millia Islamia
University of Hyderabad
Indira Gandhi Institute of Development Research
Centre for Development Studies
Gokhale Institute of Politics and Economics

References

Universities in Bangalore
2017 establishments in Karnataka
Educational institutions established in 2017
Business schools in Bangalore